Vallista is the fifteenth book in Steven Brust's Vlad Taltos series, set in the fantasy world of Dragaera. It was released in October 2017. Following the trend of the series, it is named after one of the Great Houses, and the personality characteristics associated with that House are integral to its plot.

Plot summary 

This story is set immediately before the events of Hawk. It features the character Devera in a larger role than any previous Vlad novel, with much of the story taking place in a "mysterious, seemingly empty manor" overlooking the Great Sea.

References

2017 American novels
Dragaera
2017 fantasy novels
Tor Books books
Novels by Steven Brust